Jarett Gandolfo (born June 22, 1990) is an American politician who is a member of the New York State Assembly from the 7th district. Elected in 2020, he assumed office on January 1, 2021.

Early life and education 
Gandolfo was raised in West Islip, New York and graduated from West Islip High School. He earned a Bachelor of Arts degree in criminology and sociology from University at Albany, SUNY and a Master of Public Administration from Villanova University.

Career 
Prior to his election to the New York State Assembly, Gandolfo served as Andrew Garbarino's chief of staff. When Garbarino was elected to the United States House of Representatives, Gandolfo announced his candidacy to succeed him. Gandolfo defeated Democratic nominee Francis T. Genco in the November election and assumed office on January 1, 2021.

Once in office, Gandolfo became a vocal critic of Governor Andrew Cuomo's use of COVID-19 pandemic emergency powers, especially the 10pm curfew imposed on restaurants and bars. Gandolfo argued that the curfew was arbitrary, ineffective, and greatly harming the food service industry.

References 

New York (state) Republicans
University at Albany, SUNY alumni
Villanova University alumni
People from West Islip, New York
People from Sayville, New York
Living people
1990 births